Kapileshwar Temple may refer to:
Kapileshwar Temple, Janakpur, a Hindu temple in Janakpur, Nepal
Kapileshwar Temple, Bihar, a Hindu temple in Bihar, India

See also
Kapaleeshwarar Temple, a Hindu temple in TamilnaduKapilesvara Siva Temple
Kapilesvara Siva Temple, a Hindu temple in Bhubaneswar, Odisha
Kapilash Temple, a Hindu temple in Dhenkanal, Odisha